Liminha is a nickname. It may refer to:

 Liminha (footballer) (1944-2013), João Crevelim, Brazilian footballer and football manager
 Liminha (musician) (born 1951), Arnolpho Lima Filho, Brazilian musician and producer